Thaumatococcus is a genus of tropical flowering plants in the arrowroot family, Marantaceae, thought for many years to contain a single species from western Africa: Thaumatococcus daniellii. A second species, however, was described in 2012: Thaumatococcus flavus, native to Gabon in central Africa.

References

Marantaceae
Flora of West Tropical Africa
Flora of Gabon
Zingiberales genera